John Bernard "Jack" Mundey  (17 October 1929 – 10 May 2020) was an Australian communist, union and environmental activist. He came to prominence during the 1970s for leading the New South Wales Builders' Labourers Federation (BLF) in the famous green bans, whereby the BLF led a successful campaign to protect the built and natural environment of Sydney from excessive and inappropriate development. Mundey was the patron of the Historic Houses Association of Australia.

Early years
John Bernard "Jack" Mundey was born on 17 October 1929 in Malanda, Queensland on the Johnstone River in the Atherton Tablelands, some 100 km west of Cairns. He was one of five siblings born to Catholic parents of Irish descent. His father was a lifetime Labor voter. His mother died when he was six. He was educated at Malanda Primary School and at St Augustine's, Cairns. He ran away from the latter due to its "authoritarian methods" of discipline.

Mundey moved to Sydney when he was 19, and became a metalworker and later a builder's labourer, joining successively the Federated Ironworkers' Association and the Builders Labourers Federation. He also played rugby league for Parramatta under Vic Hey for three years. He joined the Communist Party of Australia (CPA) in 1957.

Mundey's first wife was Stephanie Lennon; the couple had a son, Michael. 15 months after her son's birth, Stephanie Mundey died at a young age from a brain tumour. Mundey remarried, in 1965, to Judith Ann Willcocks, known as Judy Mundey. Michael, Mundey's only child, was killed in a car accident at age 22.

During the 1960s, Mundey was a crusading unionist and an advocate on a wide range of issues from safety reforms on building sites to wider issues such as feminism, gay rights and international politics. Mundey considered all these matters appropriate targets for union activism. His second wife, Judy, joined him in these campaigns and later rose to become national president of the CPA.

Green bans
In 1968, Mundey was elected secretary of the NSW Builders' Labourers Federation (BLF). From this position, he became a highly visible individual who, with his union and supportive community members, was responsible for the green bans that saved much of Sydney's heritage and built environment. He insisted that the priorities of development be reversed such that the open community spaces and heritage buildings be preserved and that affordable public housing was more important than accumulating empty or underused commercial buildings.

In 1975, Mundey and other New South Wales leaders of the BLF were expelled from the union by the federal leadership under Norm Gallagher, who was later to be convicted of corrupt dealings with developers.

According to Senator Bob Brown, former parliamentary leader of the Australian Greens the use of the term "Green" as a political category actually derives from the green bans, by way of Petra Kelly's visit to Sydney in 1977.

Mundey's autobiography, Green Bans and Beyond, was published in 1981. In 1981 Mundey joined the Quayhole Committee in their effort to save the landing site of the First Fleet at Circular Quay.

Politics

Mundey was the lead Legislative Council candidate of the Communist Party of Australia at the 1978 New South Wales state election. His party polled almost 80,000 votes – 2.9 percent of the statewide total – and outpolled the Australian Democrats. Mundey came close to winning a seat, and was the last candidate excluded from the count.

Mundey served as an alderman on the City of Sydney council from 1984 to 1987. He was chairman of the planning committee of Sydney City Council from May 1984 to September 1985.

Later life

In 1988, the University of Western Sydney made Mundey an honorary Doctor of Letters and an honorary Doctor of Science in recognition of his service to the environment for the previous 30 years.

Mundey was made a life member of the Australian Conservation Foundation in the 1990s. In 1995, in keeping with his continued interest in Sydney and the state's urban environment and heritage, he was appointed chair of the Historic Houses Trust of New South Wales, and he was also the patron of the Historic Houses Association of Australia.

In 2003, Mundey joined the Australian Greens, citing their opposition to the Iraq War and their environmental stance. He remained a member until his death.

In February 2007, the Geographical Names Board of New South Wales renamed a portion of Argyle Street in The Rocks "Jack Mundey Place" in recognition of his leadership "in the fight to preserve such significant sites in the historic Rocks area."

During mid 2009, the NSW State Labor Government headed by Premier Nathan Rees, announced the now cancelled CBD Metro rail project for Sydney. Mundey would once again enter the fray to help fight the demolition of historic buildings and space, this time in Sydney's Pyrmont and Rozelle. The government had planned to build a metro style railway between the existing city circle, over to Rozelle. This involved demolishing numerous buildings and businesses along the way. Ultimately, the CBD Metro project was cancelled, after a storm of protest.

In 2014, Mundey was named Patron of the Friends of Millers Point as he joined the fight to save the Sirius building which was built for the people of The Rocks when the green bans saved them from eviction and The Rocks from demolition forty years earlier. In 2012, he joined the action to preserve Windsor Bridge from further development. In 2017, he was awarded the NSW President's Prize at the NSW Architecture Awards.

In 2021, the year after Mundey's death, Eastlakes Reserve was renamed Jack Mundey Reserve at the request of Bayside Council.

References

Further reading
 Jack Mundey Green Bans and Beyond (1981)

External links
Jack Mundey biography and interview
Australian Trade Union Archives entry
Sydney Oral Histories

1929 births
2020 deaths
Australian LGBT rights activists
Australian trade unionists
Australian rugby league players
Communist Party of Australia members
Sydney City Councillors
Australian Greens candidates
Green bans
Officers of the Order of Australia